Ewelina Flinta (born 24 October 1979 in Lubsko) is a Polish singer. She has performed at Przystanek Woodstock and Teatr Buffo. She rose to fame by coming second in the first season of the television show Idol.

Discography

Studio albums

Music videos

References

1979 births
Living people
Polish pop singers
Polish rock singers
Polish lyricists
21st-century Polish singers
21st-century Polish women singers